The Salem Highballers was the recording name given to The McCray Family by their recording label, Okeh, in the 1920s and 1930s. They traveled somewhat but did not stray far from their hometown of Salem, Virginia.

Aside from local performances and their "Salem Highballers" sides, The McCray family's biggest claims to fame were their radio programs, performed live on Roanoke's WDBJ between 1925 and 1930.

The lineup consisted of Henry McCray on violin, Fred McCray on guitar, Carl McCray on guitar, and Robert McCray on banjo. Carl, the last surviving member, died in 1984.

Sources 
 

American country music groups